Piz Cengalo [tʃ´ɛŋɡalɔ] (3,369 m) is a mountain in the Bregaglia range of the Alps on the border between the Swiss canton of Graubünden and Italy. The first ascent of the mountain was by D. W. Freshfield and C. Comyns Tucker with guide F. Dévouassoud on 25 July 1866.  The name 'Cengalo' derives from Tschingel, meaning girdle.

On 28 December 2011 c. 1.5 million cubic metres of rock broke away from the summit area, causing a massive landslide on the Swiss side of the mountain that could be heard in Soglio and Bondo. As subsequent massive rockfalls are expected in the same area, some hiking and climbing routes have been closed. On 23 August 2017 another landslide occurred on the mountain, estimated about three times bigger than the one in 2011.

References

External links 
 Piz Cengalo on SummitPost
 Pizzo Cengalo on Hikr
 360° panorama from Piz Cengalo

Mountains of Graubünden
Mountains of Lombardy
Mountains of the Alps
Alpine three-thousanders
International mountains of Europe
Bregaglia
Val Bregaglia
Italy–Switzerland border
Mountains of Switzerland